Susanna Jane Dunachie is a British microbiologist who is Professor of Infectious Diseases at the University of Oxford. Her work considers microbiology and immunology to better understand bacterial infection and accelerate the development of vaccines. She has focused on melioidosis, scrub typhus and tuberculosis. During the COVID-19 pandemic, she studied T cell immunity to severe acute respiratory syndrome coronavirus 2.

Early life and education 
Dunachie was an undergraduate student at the University of Oxford, where she studied medicine. After graduating, she worked as a clinical research fellow with Adrian Hill searching for malaria vaccines. She remained at the University of Oxford throughout her early career, working as a specialist registrar in the John Radcliffe Hospital trust.

Research and career 
After completing her specialist training, Dunachie moved to Bangkok, where she worked in the Mahidol Oxford Tropical Medicine Research Unit. She returned to the University of Oxford in 2015, where she headed the Tropical Immunology Group. In 2020 she was appointed as Global Research Professor by the National Institute for Health Research (NIHR).

Dunachie works in infectious diseases and vaccines, particularly attempting to improve the immune responses of people suffering from diabetes. She performs research in tropical countries, where she combines microbiology and immunology to accelerate the discovery of vaccines. In particular, Dunachie has worked on melioidosis, scrub typhus, tuberculosis and severe acute respiratory syndrome coronavirus 2.

In response to the COVID-19 pandemic, Dunachie switched her focus to investigating SARS‑CoV‑2, with a specific focus on T cell immunity. At the time it was unclear what role T cells played in immunity to COVID-19. In particular, diabetic patients appeared to be more susceptible to severe disease. 

Dunachie leads the Protective Immunity for T cells in Healthcare workers (PITCH) study, which explores immune responses to the COVID-19 vaccines. She has focused on the Oxford–AstraZeneca COVID-19 vaccine and the Pfizer–BioNTech COVID-19 vaccine in the United Kingdom, but also worked with researchers in Vietnam and Bangladesh. She worked with Eleanor Barnes to investigate how immunocompromised patients respond to the vaccinations. Her hope is that the insight she gains from this work will facilitate the design of vaccinations against melioidosis.

Selected publications

References 

British microbiologists
Women microbiologists
NIHR Research Professors
Living people
Year of birth missing (living people)